The Markham slender-toed gecko (Nactus intrudusus) is a species of lizard in the family Gekkonidae. It is endemic to Papua New Guinea.

References

Nactus
Reptiles of Papua New Guinea
Reptiles described in 2020
Geckos of New Guinea